Chiyakmesh is a community of the Indigenous Squamish people,  located near Squamish, British Columbia.  The name of the Cheakamus River comes from the name of this community, which is located on Cheakamus Indian Reserve No. 11.  Chiyakamesh translates into People of the Fish Weir.  A chiyak is a special fish weir this community used on the Cheakamus River to catch salmon.  It is the largest reserve of the Squamish Nation in size.

This community was severely affected by the 2005 CN Rail Cheakamus River derailment.

See also 
 List of Aboriginal communities in Canada
 List of Squamish villages

References

External links 
Squamish Nation

Squamish villages
History of British Columbia
Unincorporated settlements in British Columbia